These are the results of the women's K-1 slalom competition in canoeing at the 1996 Summer Olympics. The K-1 (kayak single) event is raced by one-person kayaks through a whitewater course.  The venue for the 1996 Olympic competition was at the Toccoa/Ocoee River along the Georgia-Tennessee state line.

Medalists

Results
The 30 competitors each took two runs through the whitewater slalom course on July 27. The best time of the two runs counted for the event.

The gold medal was decided in a tie-breaker.

References

1996 Summer Olympics official report Volume 3. p. 162. 
1996 women's slalom K-1 results
Wallechinsky, David and Jaime Loucky (2008). "Canoeing: Women's Kayak Slalom Singles". In The Complete Book of the Olympics: 2008 Edition. London: Aurum Press Limited. p. 496.

Women's Slalom K-1
Olympic
Women's events at the 1996 Summer Olympics